Guy Delcourt (13 July 1947 – 31 January 2020) was a French politician, a member of the National Assembly.  He represented the Pas-de-Calais department,  and was a member of the Socialist Party and of the Socialiste, radical, citoyen et divers gauche parliamentary group.

References

1947 births
2020 deaths
People from Palaiseau
Socialist Party (France) politicians
Mayors of places in Hauts-de-France
Deputies of the 13th National Assembly of the French Fifth Republic
Deputies of the 14th National Assembly of the French Fifth Republic